The 2021 European Athletics U23 Championships were the 13th edition of the biennial athletics competition between European athletes under the age of twenty-three. It was planned to be held in Bergen, Norway from 8 to 11 July., but this venue was cancelled for Covid pandemic reasons.  Initially it was intended that the event would be postponed and held in another venue after the 2020 Olympic Games. Eventually the original dates were retained, and Tallinn, Estonia was chosen as the venue. This meant that Tallinn hosted two age-group championships in successive weeks: after the European Athletics U23 Championships, the Kadriorg Stadium also hosted between 15 and 18 July the European Athletics U20 Championships. For the first time in 13 editions, Italian team topped the medal table.

Medal summary

Men

Track

 Medalists who participated in heats only.

Field

Combined

Women

Track

Field

Combined

Medal table

Placing table
Results:

Participation
1162 athletes from 48 nations competed at this edition.

 (2)
 (2)
 (15)
 (1)
 (1)
 (33)
 (26)
 (3)
 (10)
 (7)
 (5)
 (51)
 (21)
 (26)
 (40)
 (71)
 (2)
 (66)
 (56)
 (39)
 (30)
 (5)
 (30)
 (12)
 (81)
 (1)
 (12)
 (19)
 (2)
 (2)
 (2)
 (1)
 (1)
 (29)
 (2)
 (32)
 (54)
 (30)
 (20)
 (2)
 (12)
 (18)
 (22)
 (70)
 (45)
 (44)
 (49)
 (58)

Records and leading marks broken

Men's 100m,  (FIN), 10.26 (NU23R)
Men's 200m, William Reais (SUI), 20.47 (EU23L), 20.55 (NU23R)
Men's 200m,  (NED), 20.62 (NU23R)
Men's 200m, Francesco Sansovini (SMR), 22.07 (NU23R)	
Men's 400m, Ricky Petrucciani (SUI), 45,02 (CR, EU23L, NU23R)
Men's 110m Hurdles, Filip Demšar (SLO), 13.84 (NU23R)
Men's 400m Hurdles, Alessandro Sibilio (ITA), 48.42 (EU23L, NU23R)
Men's Discus Throw, Kristjan Čeh (SLO), 65,59 m then 67.48 m (CR)
Men's Javelin Throw, Topias Laine (FIN), 81,67 m (EU23L)
Men's Decathlon, Andreas Bechmann (GER), 8142 pts (EU23L)
Men's Decathlon, Dario Dester (ITA), 7.936 points (NU23R)
Men's Decathlon, Markus Rooth (NOR), 7967 pts (NU23R)
Men's Decathlon, Fran Bonifačić (CRO), 7760 pts (NR)

Women's 100m, Patrizia van der Weken (LUX), 11.50 (NU23R)
Women's 100m, Mizgin Ay (TUR), 11.55 (NU23R)
Women's 200m, Dalia Kaddari (ITA), 22.64 (EU23L)
Women's 400m, Silke Lemmens (SUI), 52.73 (NU23R)
Women's 400m Hurdles, Emma Zapletalová (SVK), 54.28 (CR, NU23R)
Women's 400m Hurdles, Sara Gallego (ESP), 55.20 (NU23R)
Women's 400m Hurdles, Viivi Lehikoinen (FIN), 55.42 (NU23R)
Women's 400m Hurdles, Yasmin Giger (SUI), 55.25 (NU23R)
Women's 400m Hurdles, Marie-Charlotte Gastaud (MON), 1:04.94 (NU23R)
Women's 400m Hurdles, Beatrice Berti (SMR), 1:02.03 (NU23R)	
Women's Triple Jump, Tugba Danismaz (TUR), 14,09 m (NU23R)
Women's High Jump, Yaroslava Mahuchikh (UKR), 2,00 m (CR)
Women's 10,000m, Jasmijn Lau (NED), 32:30.49 (EU23L)

References

External links
Results book

 
European Athletics U23 Championships
European Athletics U23 Championships
European Athletics U23 Championships
European Athletics U23 Championships
Sports competitions in Tallinn
European Athletics U23 Championships
International athletics competitions hosted by Estonia